Tú eres mi destino (English title:You are my destiny)  is a Mexican telenovela produced by Ernesto Alonso for Televisa in 1984. It is an adaptation of the telenovela Cartas sin destino produced in 1973.

Claudia Islas starred as antagonistic protagonist with Enrique Álvarez Félix and María Rubio.

Plot 
The writer and journalist Eugenio Dávila loses his wife and his daughter in a plane crash that also hurts him. It seems that their world has ended, but the life will bring you many more surprises.

Cast 
Claudia Islas as Rebeca de Dávila
Enrique Álvarez Félix as Eugenio Dávila 
María Rubio as Úrsula
Óscar Servín as José Luis
Norma Lazareno as Mercedes
Miguel Manzano as Don Fausto
Laura Flores as Rosa Martha
Ninón Sevilla as Licha del Rey
Eduardo Yáñez as Fabián
Marcela de Galina as Esperanza
Edna Bolkán as Paulina
Molina as Karina
Tony Bravo as Javier
Fernando Sáenz as Homero
Alicia Osorio as Gloria
Luis Mario as José María
Aurora Alonso as Vicenta
Sara Guash as Carolina
Uriel Chavez Posada as León
Francisco Avendaño as Fernando
Carmen Cortés as Braulia
Queta Carrasco as Jacinta
Alfredo Castillo as Francisco
María Marcela as Esperanza

Awards

References

External links 

Mexican telenovelas
1984 telenovelas
1984 Mexican television series debuts
1984 Mexican television series endings
Televisa telenovelas
Spanish-language telenovelas